Till Eulenspiegel's Merry Pranks, Op. 28, is a tone poem written in 1894–95 by Richard Strauss. It chronicles the misadventures and pranks of the German peasant folk hero Till Eulenspiegel, who is represented by two themes. The first, played by the horn, is a lilting melody that reaches a peak, falls downward, and ends in three long, loud notes, each progressively lower. The second, for D clarinet, is crafty and wheedling, suggesting a trickster doing what he does best. (Till Eulenspiegel is a well-known Schnickelfritz.)

Analysis

The work opens with a "Once upon a time" theme,

as a solo horn bursts in with two repetitions of the first Till theme.

The theme is taken by the rest of the orchestra in a rondo form (which Strauss spelled in its French form, rondeau), and this beginning section concludes with the tutti orchestra repeating two notes. The clarinet theme is heard next, suggesting Till's laughter as he plots his next prank.

The music follows Till throughout the countryside, as he rides a horse through a market, upsetting the goods and wares, pokes fun at the strict Teutonic clergy (represented by the violas), flirts with and chases girls (the love theme is given to the first violins), and mocks the serious academics (represented by the bassoons).

The music suggesting a horse ride returns again, with the first theme restated all over the orchestra. The climax abruptly changes to a funeral march. Till has been captured by the authorities, and is sentenced to death for blasphemy. The funeral march of the headsman begins a dialogue with the desperate Till, who tries to wheedle and joke his way out of this predicament. Unfortunately, he has no effect on the stony executioner, who hangs him. The progress of Till being hauled up the gallows is graphically painted by the D clarinet, with the anticipatory drumroll emulated by the flutes after he has reached the top. The D clarinet wails in a distortion of the first theme, signifying his death scream as the drop begins, and a pizzicato by the strings represents the snapping of his neck as the noose rope reaches full extension. After a moment of silence, the "once upon a time" theme heard at the beginning returns, suggesting that someone like Till can never be destroyed, and the work ends with one last quotation of the musical joke.

Instrumentation
The work is scored for a large orchestra:

Woodwinds
piccolo
3 flutes
3 oboes 
English horn
2 clarinets in B
D clarinet
bass clarinet
3 bassoons
contrabassoon

Brass
4 horns in F and E
4 horns in D (ad libitum)
3 trumpets in F and C
3 trumpets in D (ad libitum)
3 trombones
tuba

Percussion
timpani
bass drum
snare drum
cymbals
triangle
large ratchet

Strings
violins I, II
violas
cellos
double basses

There also exists a version for piano four-hands, which has been recorded by Percy Grainger and Ralph Leopold.

Ballet
The work was presented as a ballet with choreography by Vaslav Nijinsky in 1916.

Discography
 Berlin Philharmonic Orchestra conducted by Claudio Abbado, Sony CD and Kultur DVD

References

External links
 
Saint Louis Symphony Concert Notes. Concert Program for November 28 and 29, 2008
Strauss, R (1864–1949) – Till Eulenspiegels Lustige Streiche, (nach alter Schelmenweise – In Rondeauform – für grosses Orchester gesetzt). Paul Serotsky, Music Web (n.d.)
Till Eulenspiegels lustige Streiche, Symphonic Poem, Op. 28. Orchestra instrumentation study score; preface: Norman Del Mar. translation preface (German): Stefan de Haan 
 
 

Tone poems by Richard Strauss
1895 compositions
Music based on European myths and legends
Humor in classical music
Till Eulenspiegel